Rotational spectroscopy is concerned with the measurement of the energies of transitions between quantized rotational states of molecules in the gas phase. The spectra of polar molecules can be measured in absorption or emission by microwave spectroscopy or by far infrared spectroscopy. The rotational spectra of non-polar molecules cannot be observed by those methods, but can be observed and measured by Raman spectroscopy. Rotational spectroscopy is sometimes referred to as pure rotational spectroscopy to distinguish it from rotational-vibrational spectroscopy where changes in rotational energy occur together with changes in vibrational energy, and also from ro-vibronic spectroscopy (or just vibronic spectroscopy) where rotational, vibrational and electronic energy changes occur simultaneously.

For rotational spectroscopy, molecules are classified according to symmetry into spherical top, linear and symmetric top; analytical expressions can be derived for the rotational energy terms of these molecules. Analytical expressions can be derived for the fourth category, asymmetric top, for rotational levels up to J=3, but higher energy levels need to be determined using numerical methods. The rotational energies are derived theoretically by considering the molecules to be rigid rotors and then applying extra terms to account for centrifugal distortion, fine structure, hyperfine structure and Coriolis coupling. Fitting the spectra to the theoretical expressions gives numerical values of the angular moments of inertia from which very precise values of molecular bond lengths and angles can be derived in favorable cases. In the presence of an electrostatic field there is Stark splitting which allows molecular electric dipole moments to be determined.

An important application of rotational spectroscopy is in exploration of the chemical composition of the interstellar medium using radio telescopes.

Applications
Rotational spectroscopy has primarily been used to investigate fundamental aspects of molecular physics. It is a uniquely precise tool for the determination of molecular structure in gas phase molecules.  It can be used to establish barriers to internal rotation such as that associated with the rotation of the  group relative to the  group in chlorotoluene. When fine or hyperfine structure can be observed, the technique also provides information on the electronic structures of molecules. Much of current understanding of the nature of weak molecular interactions such as van der Waals, hydrogen and halogen bonds has been established through rotational spectroscopy. In connection with radio astronomy, the technique has a key role in exploration of the chemical composition of the interstellar medium. Microwave transitions are measured in the laboratory and matched
to emissions from the interstellar medium using a radio telescope.  was the first stable polyatomic molecule to be identified in the interstellar medium. The measurement of chlorine monoxide  is important for atmospheric chemistry. Current projects in astrochemistry involve both laboratory microwave spectroscopy and observations made using modern radiotelescopes such as the Atacama Large Millimeter/submillimeter Array (ALMA).

Overview
A molecule in the gas phase is free to rotate relative to a set of mutually orthogonal axes of fixed orientation in space, centered on the center of mass of the molecule. Free rotation is not possible for molecules in liquid or solid phases due to the presence of intermolecular forces. Rotation about each unique axis is associated with a set of quantized energy levels dependent on the moment of inertia about that axis and a quantum number. Thus, for linear molecules the energy levels are described by a single moment of inertia and a single quantum number, which defines the magnitude of the rotational angular momentum.

For nonlinear molecules which are symmetric rotors (or symmetric tops - see next section), there are two moments of inertia and the energy also depends on a second rotational quantum number, which defines the vector component of rotational angular momentum along the principal symmetry axis. Analysis of spectroscopic data with the expressions detailed below results in quantitative determination of the value(s) of the moment(s) of inertia. From these precise values of the molecular structure and dimensions may be obtained.

For a linear molecule, analysis of the rotational spectrum provides values for the rotational constant and the moment of inertia of the molecule, and, knowing the atomic masses, can be used to determine the bond length directly. For diatomic molecules this process is straightforward. For linear molecules with more than two atoms it is necessary to measure the spectra of two or more isotopologues, such as 16O12C32S and 16O12C34S. This allows a set of simultaneous equations to be set up and solved for the bond lengths). A bond length obtained in this way is slightly different from the equilibrium bond length. This is because there is zero-point energy in the vibrational ground state, to which the rotational states refer, whereas the equilibrium bond length is at the minimum in the potential energy curve. The relation between the rotational constants is given by

where v is a vibrational quantum number and α is a vibration-rotation interaction constant which can be calculated if the B values for two different vibrational states can be found.

For other molecules, if the spectra can be resolved and individual transitions assigned both bond lengths and bond angles can be deduced. When this is not possible, as with most asymmetric tops, all that can be done is to fit the spectra to three moments of inertia calculated from an assumed molecular structure. By varying the molecular structure the fit can be improved, giving a qualitative estimate of the structure. Isotopic substitution is invaluable when using this approach to the determination of molecular structure.

Classification of molecular rotors
In quantum mechanics the free rotation of a molecule is quantized, so that the rotational energy and the angular momentum can take only certain fixed values, which are related simply to the moment of inertia, of the molecule. For any molecule, there are three moments of inertia: ,  and  about three mutually orthogonal axes A, B, and C with the origin at the center of mass of the system. The general convention, used in this article, is to define the axes such that , with axis  corresponding to the smallest moment of inertia. Some authors, however, define the  axis as the molecular rotation axis of highest order.

The particular pattern of energy levels (and, hence, of transitions in the rotational spectrum) for a molecule is determined by its symmetry. A convenient way to look at the molecules is to divide them into four different classes, based on the symmetry of their structure. These are

Selection rules

Microwave and far-infrared spectra
Transitions between rotational states can be observed in molecules with a permanent electric dipole moment.

Since these transitions are due to absorption (or emission) of a single photon with a spin of one, conservation of angular momentum implies that the molecular angular momentum can change by at most one unit. Moreover, the quantum number K is limited to have values between and including +J to -J.

Raman spectra
For Raman spectra the molecules undergo transitions in which an incident photon is absorbed and another scattered photon is emitted. The general selection rule for such a transition to be allowed is that the molecular polarizability must be anisotropic, which means that it is not the same in all directions. Polarizability is a 3-dimensional tensor that can be represented as an ellipsoid. The polarizability ellipsoid of spherical top molecules is in fact spherical so those molecules show no rotational Raman spectrum. For all other molecules both Stokes and anti-Stokes lines can be observed and they have similar intensities due to the fact that many rotational states are thermally populated. The selection rule for linear molecules is ΔJ = 0, ±2. The reason for the values ±2 is that the polarizability returns to the same value twice during a rotation. The value ΔJ = 0 does not correspond to a molecular transition but rather to Rayleigh scattering in which the incident photon merely changes direction.

The selection rule for symmetric top molecules is
 ΔK = 0
 If K = 0, then ΔJ = ±2
 If K ≠ 0, then ΔJ = 0, ±1, ±2

Transitions with ΔJ = +1 are said to belong to the R series, whereas transitions with  belong to an S series. Since Raman transitions involve two photons, it is possible for the molecular angular momentum to change by two units.

Units
The units used for rotational constants depend on the type of measurement. With infrared spectra in the wavenumber scale, the unit is usually the inverse centimeter, written as cm−1, which is literally the number of waves in one centimeter, or the reciprocal of the wavelength in centimeters. On the other hand, for microwave spectra in the frequency scale, the unit is usually the gigahertz. The relationship between these two units is derived from the expression

where ν is a frequency, λ is a wavelength and c is the velocity of light. It follows that 

As 1 GHz = 109 Hz, the numerical conversion can be expressed as

Effect of vibration on rotation
The population of vibrationally excited states follows a Boltzmann distribution, so low-frequency vibrational states are appreciably populated even at room temperatures. As the moment of inertia is higher when a vibration is excited, the rotational constants (B) decrease. Consequently, the rotation frequencies in each vibration state are different from each other. This can give rise to "satellite" lines in the rotational spectrum. An example is provided by cyanodiacetylene, H−C≡C−C≡C−C≡N.

Further, there is a fictitious force, Coriolis coupling, between the vibrational motion of the nuclei in the rotating (non-inertial) frame. However, as long as the vibrational quantum number does not change (i.e., the molecule is in only one state of vibration), the effect of vibration on rotation is not important, because the time for vibration is much shorter than the time required for rotation. The Coriolis coupling is often negligible, too, if one is interested in low vibrational and rotational quantum numbers only.

Effect of rotation on vibrational spectra

Historically, the theory of rotational energy levels was developed to account for observations of vibration-rotation spectra of gases in infrared spectroscopy, which was used before microwave spectroscopy had become practical. To a first approximation, the rotation and vibration can be treated as separable, so the energy of rotation is added to the energy of vibration. For example, the rotational energy levels for linear molecules (in the rigid-rotor approximation) are

In this approximation, the vibration-rotation wavenumbers of transitions are

In reality, this expression has to be modified for the effects of anharmonicity of the vibrations, for centrifugal distortion and for Coriolis coupling.

For the so-called R branch of the spectrum,  so that there is simultaneous excitation of both vibration and rotation. For the P branch,  so that a quantum of rotational energy is lost while a quantum of vibrational energy is gained. The purely vibrational transition, gives rise to the Q branch of the spectrum. Because of the thermal population of the rotational states the P branch is slightly less intense than the R branch.

Rotational constants obtained from infrared measurements are in good accord with those obtained by microwave spectroscopy, while the latter usually offers greater precision.

Structure of rotational spectra

Spherical top
Spherical top molecules have no net dipole moment. A pure rotational spectrum cannot be observed by absorption or emission spectroscopy because there is no permanent dipole moment whose rotation can be accelerated by the electric field of an incident photon. Also the polarizability is isotropic, so that pure rotational transitions cannot be observed by Raman spectroscopy either. Nevertheless, rotational constants can be obtained by ro–vibrational spectroscopy. This occurs when a molecule is polar in the vibrationally excited state. For example, the molecule methane is a spherical top but the asymmetric C-H stretching band shows rotational fine structure in the infrared spectrum, illustrated in rovibrational coupling. This spectrum is also interesting because it shows clear evidence of Coriolis coupling in the asymmetric structure of the band.

Linear molecules

The rigid rotor is a good starting point from which to construct a model of a rotating molecule. It is assumed that component atoms are point masses connected by rigid bonds. A linear molecule lies on a single axis and each atom moves on the surface of a sphere around the centre of mass. The two degrees of rotational freedom correspond to the spherical coordinates θ and φ which describe the direction of the molecular axis, and the quantum state is determined by two quantum numbers J and M. J defines the magnitude of the rotational angular momentum, and M its component about an axis fixed in space, such as an external electric or magnetic field. In the absence of external fields, the energy depends only on J. Under the rigid rotor model, the rotational energy levels, F(J), of the molecule can be expressed as,

where  is the rotational constant of the molecule and is related to the moment of inertia of the molecule. In a linear molecule the moment of inertia about an axis perpendicular to the molecular axis is unique, that is, so 

For a diatomic molecule
 
where m1 and m2 are the masses of the atoms and d is the distance between them.

Selection rules dictate that during emission or absorption the rotational quantum number has to change by unity; i.e., . Thus, the locations of the lines in a rotational spectrum will be given by

where  denotes the lower level and  denotes the upper level involved in the transition.

The diagram illustrates rotational transitions that obey the =1 selection rule. The dashed lines show how these transitions map onto features that can be observed experimentally.  Adjacent  transitions are separated by 2B in the observed spectrum. Frequency or wavenumber units can also be used for the x axis of this plot.

Rotational line intensities

The probability of a transition taking place is the most important factor influencing the intensity of an observed rotational line. This probability is proportional to the population of the initial state involved in the transition. The population of a rotational state depends on two factors. The number of molecules in an excited state with quantum number J, relative to the number of molecules in the ground state, NJ/N0 is given by the Boltzmann distribution as
, 
where k is the Boltzmann constant and T the absolute temperature. This factor decreases as J increases. This factor increases as J increases. Combining the two factors
 

The maximum relative intensity occurs at

The diagram at the right shows an intensity pattern roughly corresponding to the spectrum above it.

Centrifugal distortion
When a molecule rotates, the centrifugal force pulls the atoms apart. To account for this a centrifugal distortion correction term is added to the rotational energy levels of the diatomic molecule.

where  is the centrifugal distortion constant.

Therefore, the line positions for the rotational mode change to

In consequence, the spacing between lines is not constant, as in the rigid rotor approximation, but decreases with increasing rotational quantum number.

An assumption underlying these expressions is that the molecular vibration follows simple harmonic motion. In the harmonic approximation the centrifugal constant   can be derived as

where k is the vibrational force constant.

where  is the harmonic vibration frequency, follows. If anharmonicity is to be taken into account, terms in higher powers of J should be added to the expressions for the energy levels and line positions. A striking example concerns the rotational spectrum of hydrogen fluoride which was fitted to terms up to [J(J+1)]5.

Oxygen
The electric dipole moment of the dioxygen molecule,  is zero, but the molecule is paramagnetic with two unpaired electrons so that there are magnetic-dipole allowed transitions which can be observed by microwave spectroscopy. The unit electron spin has three spatial orientations with respect to the given molecular rotational angular momentum vector, K, so that each rotational level is split into three states, J = K + 1, K, and K - 1, each J state of this so-called p-type triplet arising from a different orientation of the spin with respect to the rotational motion of the molecule. The energy difference between successive J terms in any of these triplets is about 2 cm−1 (60 GHz), with the single exception of J = 1←0 difference which is about 4 cm−1. Selection rules for magnetic dipole transitions allow transitions between successive members of the triplet (ΔJ = ±1) so that for each value of the rotational angular momentum quantum number K there are two allowed transitions. The 16O nucleus has zero nuclear spin angular momentum, so that symmetry considerations demand that K have only odd values.

Symmetric top
For symmetric rotors a quantum number J is associated with the total angular momentum of the molecule. For a given value of J, there is a 2J+1- fold degeneracy with the quantum number, M taking the values +J ...0 ... -J. The third quantum number, K is associated with rotation about the principal rotation axis of the molecule. In the absence of an external electrical field, the rotational energy of a symmetric top is a function of only J and K and, in the rigid rotor approximation, the energy of each rotational state is given by

This gives the transition wavenumbers as

which is the same as in the case of a linear molecule. With a first order correction for centrifugal distortion the transition wavenumbers become

The term in DJK has the effect of removing degeneracy present in the rigid rotor approximation, with different K values.

Asymmetric top

The quantum number J refers to the total angular momentum, as before. Since there are three independent moments of inertia, there are two other independent quantum numbers to consider, but the term values for an asymmetric rotor cannot be derived in closed form. They are obtained by individual matrix diagonalization for each J value. Formulae are available for molecules whose shape approximates to that of a symmetric top.

The water molecule is an important example of an asymmetric top. It has an intense pure rotation spectrum in the far infrared region, below about 200 cm−1. For this reason far infrared spectrometers have to be freed of atmospheric water vapour either by purging with a dry gas or by evacuation. The spectrum has been analyzed in detail.

Quadrupole splitting
When a nucleus has a spin quantum number, I, greater than 1/2 it has a quadrupole moment. In that case, coupling of nuclear spin angular momentum with rotational angular momentum causes splitting of the rotational energy levels. If the quantum number J of a rotational level is greater than I,  levels are produced; but if J is less than I,  levels result. The effect is one type of hyperfine splitting. For example, with 14N in HCN, all levels with J > 0 are split into 3. The energies of the sub-levels are proportional to the nuclear quadrupole moment and a function of F and J. where , . Thus, observation of nuclear quadrupole splitting permits the magnitude of the nuclear quadrupole moment to be determined.
This is an alternative method to the use of nuclear quadrupole resonance spectroscopy. The selection rule for rotational transitions becomes

Stark and Zeeman effects
In the presence of a static external electric field the  degeneracy of each rotational state is partly removed, an instance of a Stark effect. For example, in linear molecules each energy level is split into  components. The extent of splitting depends on the square of the electric field strength and the square of the dipole moment of the molecule. In principle this provides a means to determine the value of the molecular dipole moment with high precision. However, because the splitting depends on μ2, the orientation of the dipole must be deduced from quantum mechanical considerations.

A similar removal of degeneracy will occur when a paramagnetic molecule is placed in a magnetic field, an instance of the Zeeman effect. Most species which can be observed in the gaseous state are diamagnetic . Exceptions are odd-electron molecules such as nitric oxide, NO, nitrogen dioxide, some chlorine oxides and the hydroxyl radical. The Zeeman effect has been observed with dioxygen,

Rotational Raman spectroscopy
Molecular rotational transitions can also be observed by Raman spectroscopy. Rotational transitions are  Raman-allowed for any molecule with an anisotropic polarizability which includes all molecules except for spherical tops. This means that rotational transitions of molecules with no permanent dipole moment, which cannot be observed in absorption or emission, can be observed, by scattering,  in Raman spectroscopy. Very high resolution Raman spectra can be obtained by adapting a Fourier Transform Infrared Spectrometer. It shows the effect of nuclear spin, resulting in intensities variation of 3:1 in adjacent lines. A bond length of 109.9985 ± 0.0010 pm was deduced from the data.

Instruments and methods
The great majority of contemporary spectrometers use a mixture of commercially available and bespoke components which users integrate according to their particular needs. Instruments can be broadly categorised according to their general operating principles. Although rotational transitions can be found across a very broad region of the electromagnetic spectrum, fundamental physical constraints exist on the operational bandwidth of instrument components. It is often impractical and costly to switch to measurements within an entirely different frequency region. The instruments and operating principals described below are generally appropriate to microwave spectroscopy experiments conducted at frequencies between 6 and 24 GHz.

Absorption cells and Stark modulation
A microwave spectrometer can be most simply constructed using a source of microwave radiation, an absorption cell into which sample gas can be introduced and a detector such as a superheterodyne receiver. A spectrum can be obtained by sweeping the frequency of the source while detecting the intensity of transmitted radiation. A simple section of waveguide can serve as an absorption cell. An important variation of the technique in which an alternating current is applied across electrodes within the absorption cell results in a modulation of the frequencies of rotational transitions. This is referred to as Stark modulation and allows the use of phase-sensitive detection methods offering improved sensitivity. Absorption spectroscopy allows the study of samples that are thermodynamically stable at room temperature.  The first study of the microwave spectrum of a molecule was performed by Cleeton & Williams in 1934. Subsequent experiments exploited powerful sources of microwaves such as the klystron, many of which were developed for radar during the Second World War. The number of experiments in microwave spectroscopy surged immediately after the war. By 1948, Walter Gordy was able to prepare a review of the results contained in approximately 100 research papers. Commercial versions  of microwave absorption spectrometer were developed by Hewlett Packard in the 1970s and were once widely used for fundamental research. Most research laboratories now exploit either Balle-Flygare or chirped-pulse Fourier transform microwave (FTMW) spectrometers.

Fourier transform microwave (FTMW) spectroscopy
The theoretical framework underpinning FTMW spectroscopy is analogous to that used to describe FT-NMR spectroscopy. The behaviour of the evolving system is described by optical Bloch equations. First, a short (typically 0-3 microsecond duration) microwave pulse is introduced on resonance with a rotational transition. Those molecules that absorb the energy from this pulse are induced to rotate coherently in phase with the incident radiation. De-activation of the polarisation pulse is followed by microwave emission that accompanies decoherence of the molecular ensemble. This free induction decay occurs on a timescale of 1-100 microseconds depending on instrument settings. Following pioneering work by Dicke and co-workers in the 1950s, the first FTMW spectrometer was constructed by Ekkers and Flygare in 1975.

Balle–Flygare FTMW spectrometer
Balle, Campbell, Keenan and Flygare demonstrated that the FTMW technique can be applied within a "free space cell" comprising an evacuated chamber containing a Fabry-Perot cavity. This technique allows a sample to be probed only milliseconds after it undergoes rapid cooling to only a few kelvins in the throat of an expanding gas jet. This was a revolutionary development because (i) cooling molecules to low temperatures concentrates the available population in the lowest rotational energy levels. Coupled with benefits conferred by the use of a Fabry-Perot cavity, this brought a great enhancement in the sensitivity and resolution of spectrometers along with a reduction in the complexity of observed spectra; (ii) it became possible to isolate and study molecules that are very weakly bound because there is insufficient energy available for them to undergo fragmentation or chemical reaction at such low temperatures. William Klemperer was a pioneer in using this instrument for the exploration of weakly bound interactions. While the Fabry-Perot cavity of a Balle-Flygare FTMW spectrometer can typically be tuned into resonance at any frequency between 6 and 18 GHz, the bandwidth of individual measurements is restricted to about 1 MHz. An animation illustrates the operation of this instrument which is currently the most widely used tool for microwave spectroscopy.

Chirped-Pulse FTMW spectrometer
Noting that digitisers and related electronics technology had significantly progressed since the inception of FTMW spectroscopy, B.H. Pate at the University of Virginia  designed a spectrometer which retains many advantages of the Balle-Flygare FT-MW spectrometer while innovating in (i) the use of a high speed (>4 GS/s) arbitrary waveform generator to generate a "chirped" microwave polarisation pulse that sweeps up to 12 GHz in frequency in less than a microsecond and (ii) the use of a high speed (>40 GS/s) oscilloscope to digitise and Fourier transform the molecular free induction decay. The result is an instrument that allows the study of weakly bound molecules but which is able to exploit a measurement bandwidth (12 GHz) that is greatly enhanced compared with the Balle-Flygare FTMW spectrometer. Modified versions of the original CP-FTMW spectrometer have been constructed by a number of groups in the United States, Canada and Europe. The instrument offers a broadband capability that is highly complementary to the high sensitivity and resolution offered by the Balle-Flygare design.

Notes

References

Bibliography

External links
infrared gas spectra simulator
Hyperphysics article on Rotational Spectrum
A list of microwave spectroscopy research groups around the world

Spectroscopy
Rotation
Rigid bodies mechanics